In computer science, in particular in concurrency theory, a dependency relation is a binary relation on a finite domain , symmetric, and reflexive; i.e. a finite tolerance relation.  That is, it is a finite set of ordered pairs , such that

 If   then   (symmetric)
 If , then   (reflexive)

In general, dependency relations are not transitive; thus, they generalize the notion of an equivalence relation by discarding transitivity.

The independency relation is symmetric and irreflexive. Conversely, given any symmetric and irreflexive relation  on a finite alphabet, the relation

is a dependency relation.

The pair  is called the concurrent alphabet. The pair  is called the independency alphabet or reliance alphabet, but this term may also refer to the triple  (with  induced by ). Elements  are called dependent if  holds, and independent, else (i.e. if  holds).

Given a reliance alphabet , a symmetric and irreflexive relation  can be defined on the free monoid  of all possible strings of finite length by:  for all strings  and all independent symbols . Informally,  holds if the string  can be transformed into  by a finite sequence of swaps of adjacent independent symbols.

Examples

Then e.g. the symbols  are independent of one another, and e.g.  are dependent.

References

Binary relations